Shaftesbury Square Hospital was a health facility in Great Victoria Street, Belfast, Northern Ireland. It was managed by the Belfast Health and Social Care Trust.

History 
The facility, which was financed by Sir William Johnson and his wife, Lady Johnson, was designed by W. J. Barre and opened as the Shaftesbury Square Ophthalmic Hospital in January 1868. It was extended in 1927 and, after joining the National Health Service in 1948, it became Shaftesbury Square Hospital in 1969. The building was used by the local drug and substance abuse services before it closed in 2010.

References

Belfast Health and Social Care Trust
Hospital buildings completed in 1868
Hospitals in Belfast
1868 establishments in Ireland
Hospitals established in 1868
Defunct hospitals in Northern Ireland
2010 disestablishments in Northern Ireland
Hospitals disestablished in 2010
19th-century architecture in Northern Ireland